Patricia Cutts (20 July 1926 – 6 September 1974) was an English film and television actress. She was the first person to portray the character of Blanche Hunt in ITV soap opera Coronation Street, appearing in two episodes.

Biography
Born in London, she was the daughter of the writer-director Graham Cutts. Her first roles were supporting parts in British films. These ranged from small roles to more substantial ones (such as playing the love interest in Those People Next Door (1953)). She moved to the USA in 1958, where she appeared in American movies and television shows. From 1958, she appeared in Alfred Hitchcock Presents and Perry Mason, where she played defendant Sylvia Oxman in the 1959 episode, "The Case of the Dangerous Dowager" and murderer Ann Eldridge in the 1966 episode, "The Case of the Bogus Buccaneers". She continued to work consistently in film and television on both sides of the Atlantic throughout the 1950s, including a small appearance in North by Northwest.

In 1959 she appeared on Groucho Marx's quiz show You Bet Your Life with football coach Jack Curtice as her co-contestant. She was a regular panellist on the DuMont quiz Down You Go and starred alongside Vincent Price in The Tingler. In 1958, she appeared in the film Merry Andrew, starring Danny Kaye. The following year, she had a good role as the second female lead in the war movie Battle of the Coral Sea (1959). In the 1960s, she made guest appearances on such television shows as The Lucy Show, Car 54, Where Are You?, Adventures in Paradise and Playhouse 90.

After several quiet years she returned to the UK and was in the 1972 British television series Spyder's Web before accepting the role of Blanche Hunt in the ITV soap opera Coronation Street in 1974. It would have been her most high-profile regular role to date but after appearing in only two episodes, Cutts was found dead at her flat in Chelsea, London, aged 48. An inquest into her death produced a verdict of suicide by barbiturate poisoning.

Selected filmography

 Flying with Prudence  (1946)  - Prudence
 Just William's Luck (1948) -  Gloria's Secretary
 I Was a Male War Bride (1949) - Girl in Doorway (uncredited)
 Madness of the Heart (1949) - Girl at bookstall
 The Adventures of PC 49 "Investigating the Case of the Guardian Angel" (1949) - Joan Carr
 Your Witness (1950) - Alex Summerfield, Roger's Sister in Law
 The Long Dark Hall (1951) - Rose Mallory
 Those People Next Door (1953) - Anne Twigg
 The Happiness of Three Women (1954) - Irene Jennings
 The Man Who Loved Redheads (1955) - Bubbles
 Merry Andrew (1958) - Letitia Fairchild
 North by Northwest (1959) - Hospital Patient (uncredited)
 The Tingler (1959) - Isabel Stevens Chapin
 Battle of the Coral Sea (1959) - Lt. Peg Whitcomb
 Perry Mason
"The Case Of the Dangerous Dowager" (1959) - Sylvia Oxman
"The Case of the Bogus Buccaneer" (1966) - Ann Eldridge
 Yancy Derringer (1959) - Lady Charity, Ep. 20, "Hell and High Water"
 Private Road (1971) - Erica Talbot

References

External links
 
 

1926 births
1974 deaths
English film actresses
English television actresses
Suicides in Chelsea
Drug-related deaths in England
Barbiturates-related deaths
20th-century English actresses
Suicides by poison
Alumni of RADA
1974 suicides
Female suicides